Gyeon (甄), (堅) is a Korean surname.

Meaning
Gyeon comes from the Sino-Korean 京 (gyeong) meaning "capital city", 景 (gyeong) meaning "scenery, view", 敬 (gyeong) meaning "respect, honour", or other hanja characters with the same pronunciation.

It usually occurs in combination with another character, though it is sometimes used as a stand-alone name.

甄 (Zhen) 
Gyeon (甄) is a Chinese–Korean surname. It has two Chinese dialects: Zhen and Jian. This is due to the change of dialect by Sun Quan. In the Korean language it also has two dialects: Gyeon and Jin.

堅 (Jian) 
Gyeon Quan (堅權) was a general during the early Goryeo dynasty in the 10th century AD.

See also

Jeon (Korean name)

Korean-language surnames